The Bustan al-Marj Regional Council (Mo'atza Azorit Bustan al-Marj) is a regional council in northern Israel. Its territory lies adjacent to the Jezreel Valley and north of Afula, and includes four Arab villages:

Ed Dahi
Kafr Misr
Nein
Sulam

External links
 Official website
 Official website 

 
Regional councils in Northern District (Israel)
Arab localities in Israel